The 2018 SWAC women's basketball tournament is an event which took place March 6–10, 2018. Tournament quarterfinal games were held at campus sites, hosted by the higher seed, on March 6. The semifinals and championship are at Delmar Fieldhouse in Houston. The winner, Gambling State, received the Southwestern Athletic Conference's automatic bid to the 2018 NCAA Women's Division I Basketball Championship.

Seeds

Bracket

See also
 2018 SWAC men's basketball tournament

External links
 2018 SWAC Women's Basketball Championship

References

SWAC women's basketball tournament
2017–18 Southwestern Athletic Conference women's basketball season